Imbophorus leucophasmus is a species of moth of the family Pterophoridae. It is found in Australia.

The wingspan is 15–18 mm.

References

Pterophorini
Moths of Australia
Moths described in 1911
Taxa named by Alfred Jefferis Turner